General elections were held in Gabon on 19 March 1967 to elect a President and the National Assembly. Incumbent Léon M'ba of the Gabonese Democratic Bloc was the only candidate in the presidential election, and was elected unopposed. In the National Assembly election the Gabonese Democratic Bloc was the only party to contest the election, and won all 47 seats. Voter turnout was 99.4%.

On 27 November 1967, just days after he took his presidential oath at the Gabonese embassy, M'ba died from cancer, and was succeeded by Ali Bernard Bongo. He declared the country a one-party state the following year.

Results

President

National Assembly

References

General
Gabon
Elections in Gabon
Single-candidate elections
One-party elections
Presidential elections in Gabon